Swedish dialects are the various forms of the Swedish language, particularly those that differ considerably from Standard Swedish.

Traditional dialects

The linguistic definition of a Swedish traditional dialect, in the literature merely called dialect, is a local variant that has not been heavily influenced by Standard Swedish and that can trace a separate development all the way back to Old Norse. Many of the genuine rural dialects have very distinct phonetic and grammatical features, such as plural forms of verbs or archaic case inflections. These dialects can be nearly incomprehensible to most Swedes, and most of their speakers are also fluent in Standard Swedish.

"parish speech"). They are generally separated into the six traditional dialect groups, with common characteristics of prosody, grammar and vocabulary. The color represents the core area and the samples are from Svenska Dagbladets dialect project.South Swedish dialects (dark blue); (Skåne, Perstorps socken, N. Åsbo härad).Götaland dialects (red); (Västergötland, Korsberga socken, Vartofta härad, Skaraborgs län).Svealand dialects (dark green); (Uppland, Håtuna socken, Håbo härad).Norrland dialects (light blue); (Västerbotten, Skellefte socken, Löparnäs).Finland Swedish and Estonian Swedish (orange); (Finland, Österbotten, Sideby socken).Gotland dialects''' (light green); (Gotland, När Socken, Gotlands södra härad).

The areas with mixed colors as stripes are transitional areas. The parts in yellow with coloured dots represent various distinct dialect areas which are not easily defined as belonging to any of the six major groups above. The areas west of the core for Norrland dialects, west of Svealand dialects and north of Götaland dialects are related to each of these, respectively, indicated by the colour of the dots. Samples from these areas: Jämtland, Föllinge socken (related to Norrland dialects), Dalarna, Älvdalens socken (related to Svealand dialects) and Värmland, Nordmarks härad, Töcksmarks socken (related to Götaland dialects). The dialects of this category have in common that they all show more or less strong Norwegian influences, especially the dialects in Härjedalen, Northwestern Jämtland and Northwestern Dalarna. Dialects often show similarities along traditional travelling routes such as the great rivers in Northern Sweden, which start in the mountains at the Norwegian border and then follow a South-Easterly path towards the Bothnian Sea.
The grey area does not have any independently developed Swedish dialect.

Here is a summary of some of the most important differences between the major groups.

Note that this table does not hold for the distinct (dotted) or transitional (striped) areas.

Götaland dialects are mostly used in Västergötland, Dalsland, northern Halland, northern Småland and Östergötland although they are also heard in Bohuslän, Värmland (a special case, in many ways), and Öland.

A characteristic of Svealand dialects is the coalescence of the alveolar trill with following dental and alveolar consonants — also over word-boundaries — that transforms them into retroflex consonants that in some cases reduces the distinction between words (as for instance  — , i.e. "habit" — "warn"). This feature is also found in East Norwegian, North Swedish and in some dialects of Scottish Gaelic.

  +  → 
  +  → 
  +  → 
  +  → 
  +  →

Classification
The following dialect groups are sometimes classified as "Swedish" in the broadest sense (North Scandinavian):

 Archaic Gutnish
 Dalecarlian
 Archaic Finnish Swedish, Estonian Swedish, Swedish
 Archaic Norrlandic, Jamtska

Dalecarlian is intermediate in some respects between East and West Scandinavian. Scanian, a dialect of East Danish, is South Scandinavian, along with Danish, East Danish, and Jutish.

See also
Norwegian dialects
Danish dialects
Scanian dialects

Notes

References

External links
 More samples, from many dialects not listed in this article. (Swedish site)
Dialect map with audio from the Swedish Institute for Language and Folklore.